Shahrivar is the sixth month of the Solar Hijri calendar, the official calendar of Iran and Afghanistan. Shahrivar has thirty-one days. It begins in August and ends in September by the Gregorian calendar. The Afghan Persian name is Sonbola; in Pashto it is Waǵay.

Shahrivar is the third and final month of summer. It is followed by Mehr.

The name of the month comes from the Zoroastrian deity Kshatra Vairya.

Events 
 26 - 1299 - The American Professional Football Association, later the National Football League, officially begins operations with 14 teams. The league began with Ralph Hay assuming the league's leadership before handing over to Native American athlete Jim Thorpe who became the league's first Commissioner (then President).
 9 - 1302 - Great Kantō earthquake in Japan
 9 - 1318 - Invasion of Poland, beginning of Second World War in Central and Western Europe
 25 -1318 - Soviet invasion of Poland begins
 1 - 1324 - King Michael's Coup 
 18 - 1324 - 1944 Bulgarian coup d'état
 11 - 1324 - Surrender of Japan
 9 - 1336 - Independence of the Federation of Malaya proclaimed.
 25 - 1342 - Proclamation of Malaysia
 26 - 1383 - 1984 South Asian Games opens
 1 - 1368 - Baltic Way demonstrations in the Soviet Union.
 20 - 1380 - September 11 attacks
 11 - 1383 - Beslan school siege in North Ossetian Autonomous Republic, Russia
 23 - 1387 - Delhi bombings, India
 5 (- 10) - 1391 - 16th Summit of the Non-Aligned Movement, in Tehran, Iran.
 30 - 1392 - Westgate shopping mall attack in Kenya
 22 - 1397 - Merrimack Valley gas explosions, Massachusetts, United States

Births 
 18 - 1362 - Edwin Jackson, American baseball player, Olympic silver medalist

Deaths 

 20 - 1392 - Abdolmohammad Ayati, Iranian scholar, translator, and writer.
 17 - 1401 - Elizabeth II

Observances 
 Day of the National Flag (Ukraine), Black Ribbon Day and Liberation from Fascist Occupation Day (Romania and Moldova) - 1-2 Shahrivar
 Independence Day of Ukraine - 2-3 Shahrivar
 Day of Combat Against British Colonialism - 3 Shahrivar
 Cincture of the Theotokos, Independence Day (Malaysia) - 8/9 Shahrivar
 Beginning of the Indiction-Ecclesiastical Year of the Eastern Orthodox Churches - 10 Shahrivar
 Victory over Japan Day - 11-12 Shahrivar
 Nativity of the Theotokos - 16 or 17 Shahrivar
 Enkutatash - 20-21 Shahrivar
 Feast of the Cross - 23-24 Shahrivar
 Mexican Independence Day and Malaysia Day - 25 Shahrivar
 United States Air Force Day and Chilean Independence Day - 27-28 Shahrivar
 Chilean Army Day - 28-29 Shahrivar

References 

Months of the Iranian calendar